John Joseph Robinson was Dean of Belfast in the first decades of the 20th century.

He was born in Dublin in 1852, educated at Trinity College, Dublin and ordained in 1875. His first post was in Stepney, London but he returned to Ireland in 1879 as curate of Saint Matthias’, Dublin. He was the incumbent at Killiskey and then Delgany. From 1900 to 1903 he was Treasurer of Christ Church Cathedral, Waterford when he became Vicar of Belfast and a year later Dean of the city’s cathedral. He resigned in 1911 and emigrated to Canada where he was Rector of Christ Church Alberta until his death in June 1916.

Notes

1852 births
Christian clergy from Dublin (city)
Alumni of Trinity College Dublin
Deans of Belfast
Irish emigrants to Canada
1916 deaths